The Portuguese International Championships is a defunct tennis tournament. It was held for the first time in 1901 in Cascais. When it was active, the tournament was Portugal's most prestigious tennis competition.

History
The first edition was won by George Hillyard, who beat Clement Cazalet in the semifinals and Harold Mahony in the final. The first official international edition took place in 1902, and was won by George Gordon Dagge. In the next editions also less known players started to participate. The prestigious newspaper Tiro e Sport opened its pages to announce the third edition of the tournament, reporting: "It was with great anxiety that the results of these Championships were awaited, as, in addition to the old players, whose credits are already established, there were some relatively modern players and whose value was not at all known." The third international edition men's single tournament was won by the English R. Frazer, who defeated Dr. José Correia in the final. The same newspaper reported the next year that the competition was attended by the best Portuguese players and renowned foreign players. In 1905 the men's single tournament was won by Mr Lourdain (Jourdain). The first Portuguese to win the tournament was João de Sousa Macedo (Vila Franca) in 1907.

In the following decades, the tournament continued to be attended by prominent players. In 1932 the tournament was won by Marcel Bernard. Manuel Santana was crowned champion three times, in 1961, 1965 and 1969, while François Jauffret won the tournament twice, in 1968 and 1970.

The last edition, disputed in 1973, was won by José Edison Mandarino.

Past finals
Past champions have included:

Singles

References

External links
Tournament at Tennis Archives

Tennis tournaments in Portugal
Portugal
Sport in Lisbon
Defunct tennis tournaments in Europe
Defunct sports competitions in Portugal